The District of Columbia is a political division coterminous with Washington, D.C., the capital city of the United States. According to the Article One of the Constitution, only states may be represented in the United States Congress. The District of Columbia is not a U.S. state and therefore has no voting representation.

In 1871, Congress reorganized the District of Columbia into a single territorial government that was partially elected. It also permitted the district to elect a delegate to the House of Representatives, a type of non-voting member. Norton P. Chipman served two terms as the district's delegate until Congress abolished the territorial government in 1874. The city went nearly 100 years without any representation in Congress. With the enactment of the District of Columbia Delegate Act in 1970, its at-large congressional district was established. Constituents are again authorized to elect a delegate House. The district has held 29 delegate elections in total.

In 2009, the Senate passed the District of Columbia House Voting Rights Act, which would allow the district to elect a voting member to the House. However, an amendment added by John Ensign would repeal most of the district's gun laws and prohibit it from restricting gun rights any further. This took place eight months after the Supreme Court's ruling on District of Columbia v. Heller, which declared a D.C. gun law unconstitutional. The Democratic leaders in the House admitted that they could not support the bill if it included the Ensign amendment, and the never voted on it.

The majority of residents want the district to become a state and gain full voting representation in Congress. To prepare for this goal, the district has elected shadow representatives since 1990. The shadow representative emulates the role of representing the district in the House and pushes for statehood alongside the delegate and shadow senators. The district has held 17 shadow representative elections.

The Democratic Party has immense political strength in the district; in each of the delegate and shadow representative elections (excluding the 1870s elections), the district has overwhelmingly voted for the Democratic candidate, with no margin less than 33 and 56 percentage points, respectively. In two delegate and two shadow representative elections, the Democratic candidate ran unopposed.

Delegate elections

Graph
The following graph shows the margin of victory of the Democratic Party over the runner-up in the 29 U.S. House delegate elections the District of Columbia has held, excluding the two during the 1870s.

Shadow representative elections

Graph
The following graph shows the margin of victory of the Democratic Party over the runner-up in the 17 U.S. House shadow representative elections the District of Columbia has held.

See also
 Elections in the District of Columbia
 United States presidential elections in the District of Columbia
 United States Senate elections in the District of Columbia
 List of United States House of Representatives elections (1856–present)

Notes

References